Lana Stefanac is an American mixed martial artist, grappler and black belt Brazilian jiu-jitsu practitioner and instructor. Stefanac is a World, Pan American, and US National Brazilian jiu-jitsu Champion in colored belts, she is a two-time black belt world champion and the first American woman to become world champion in both her weight class and in the Open class.

Career 
Lana Stefanac was born on 16 June 1975 in Cleveland, Ohio, US, her father was born in Lika, Croatia before emigrating to the US. Stefanac started training in Muay Thai then after meeting 3rd degree black belt Donald Park, a student of Royler Gracie, she started Brazilian jiu-jitsu (BJJ) in 2003.

In 2006, after receiving her blue belt, she won the Pan Jiu-Jitsu Championship in her division, that same year Stefanac started competing MMA winning 3 matches that year, all won by submission. Her first match was against champion boxer Martha Salazarbe. Stefanac won again the Pan Ams in the purple belt division in 2007 in both Gi and No-Gi then won silver at the ADCC Submission Wrestling World Championships.  Stefanac won three more MMA matches between 2006 and 2008, ending her MMA career with an impressive 6–0 professional record. In 2008 she had a record of 200 wins, 3 losses in both Gi and No Gi. In 2008, she won the ADCC North American Trials.

Stefanac was promoted to black belt in 2009 by Randy Bloom straight after winning double gold at the 2009 Brazilian jiu-jitsu world championship after defeating Kyra Gracie in her division and Gabi Garcia (16-0) in the Open class. Stefanac retired from MMA undefeated in 2009. In 2011 she won Bronze at the world championship in both her weight and in Open class, that same year she announced giving up competing to pursue her career in law enforcement.

Championships and accomplishments

Brazilian jiu-jitsu 
Main Achievements (Black belt):
 IBJJF World Champion (2009)
 3rd place IBJJF World Championship (2011)

Main Achievements (Colored belt):
 IBJJF Pan American No-Gi Champion (2007))
 IBJJF Pan American Champion (2006 Blue / 2007 Purple)

Grappling 
 ADCC West Coast Trials winner (2008)
 2nd Place ADCC Submission Wrestling World Championship (2007)

Mixed martial arts 
3 Professional MMA Title Belts in 2 weight divisions

Mixed martial arts record 

|Win
|align=center|6–0
|Teyvia Reid
|Technical Submission (Armbar)
|FFF 4 – Call of the Wild
|
|align=center|1
|align=center|0:36
|Los Angeles, United States
|
|-
|Win
|align=center|5–0
|Megumi Yabushita
|Decision (Unanimous)
|Smackgirl 7th anniversary: Starting Over
|
|align=center|2
|align=center|5:00
|Tokyo, Japan
|
|-
|Win
|align=center|4–0
|Franita Gathings
|Decision (Unanimous)
|AOW – Art of War 3
|
|align=center|1
|align=center|1:07
|Dallas, United States
|
|-
|Win
|align=center|3–0
|Teyvia Reid
|Technical Submission (Armbar)
|FCFS 4 – Damage Control
|
|align=center|1
|align=center|5:00
|Indiana, United States
|
|-
|Win
|align=center|2–0
|Stacy Piper Ford
|Submission (Armbar)
|FCFS 3 – Full Contact Fight Series
|
|align=center|1
|align=center|0:29
|Indiana, United States
|
|-
|Win
|align=center|1–0
|Martha Salazar
|Submission (Guillotine Choke)
|Extreme Wars 3 – Bay Area Brawl
|
|align=center|1
|align=center|2:09
|Oakland, United States
|

Private life 
Stefanac's brother Mark is a police officer, a BJJ black belt and the owner of the Relson Gracie Jiu-Jitsu Academy in Willoughby, Ohio.

Notes

References 

Mixed martial artists from Ohio
Sportspeople from Cleveland
American practitioners of Brazilian jiu-jitsu
Female Brazilian jiu-jitsu practitioners
American female mixed martial artists
Living people
Middleweight mixed martial artists
Mixed martial artists utilizing Brazilian jiu-jitsu
World Brazilian Jiu-Jitsu Championship medalists
Brazilian jiu-jitsu world champions (women)
21st-century American women
1975 births